Mary M. Poling (born November 23, 1946 in Barbour County, West Virginia) is an American politician and a Democratic member of the West Virginia House of Delegates representing District 47 since January 12, 2013. Poling served consecutively from January 2001 until January 2013 in the District 40 seat.

Education
Poling earned her BS and MS from West Virginia University.

Elections
2012 Redistricted to District 47, and with incumbent Representative Harold Michael retiring, Poling was unopposed for the May 8, 2012 Democratic Primary, winning with 1,971 votes, and won the November 6, 2012 General election with 3,612 votes (54.7%) against Republican nominee John Rose.
2000 When House District 40 Representative Rick Everson left the Legislature and left the seat open, Poling won the three-way 2000 Democratic Primary and won the November 7, 2000 General election against Republican nominee Lonnie Moore, who had run for the seat in 1998.
2002 Poling and returning 2000 opponent Lonnie Moore both won their 2002 primaries, setting up a rematch; Poling won the November 5, 2002 General election against Moore.
2004 Poling was unopposed for the 2004 Democratic Primary and won November 2, 2004 General election against Republican nominee William Wright.
2006 Poling was unopposed for the 2006 Democratic Primary and won the November 7, 2006 General election against Republican nominee Garry Tenney.
2008 Poling and returning 2000 and 2002 Republican opponent Lonnie Moore were both unopposed for their May 13, 2008 primaries, setting up their third contest; Poling won the November 4, 2008 General election with 4,767 votes (63.9%) against Moore.
2010 Poling and Moore were both unopposed for their May 11, 2010 primaries, setting up their fourth contest; Poling won the November 2, 2010 General election with 3,568 votes (62.3%) against Moore.

References

External links
Official page at the West Virginia Legislature

Mary Poling at Ballotpedia
Mary M. Poling at OpenSecrets

1946 births
Living people
Democratic Party members of the West Virginia House of Delegates
People from Barbour County, West Virginia
West Virginia University alumni
Women state legislators in West Virginia